was a Japanese photographer.

References

Japanese photographers
1916 births
1992 deaths